This is a list of electoral divisions and wards in the ceremonial county of Dorset in South West England. All changes since the re-organisation of local government following the passing of the Local Government Act 1972 are shown. The number of councillors elected for each electoral division or ward is shown in brackets.

Unitary authority councils

Dorset

Wards from 2 May 2019 to present:

Bournemouth, Christchurch and Poole

Wards from 2 May 2019 to present:

Former county council

Dorset
Electoral Divisions from 1 April 1974 (first election 12 April 1973) to 2 May 1985:

Electoral Divisions from 2 May 1985 to 5 May 2005:

Electoral Divisions from 5 May 2005 to 4 May 2017:

Electoral Divisions from 4 May 2017 to 2 May 2019 (county abolished):

Former unitary authority councils

Bournemouth
Wards from 1 April 1974 (first election 7 June 1973) to 3 May 1979:

Wards from 3 May 1979 to 1 May 2003:

Wards from 1 May 2003 to 2 May 2019 (unitary authority abolished):

Poole
Wards from 1 April 1974 (first election 7 June 1973) to 5 May 1983:

Wards from 5 May 1983 to 1 May 2003:

All Wards were changed to (3) in 1996

Wards from 1 May 2003 to 7 May 2015:

Wards from 7 May 2015 to 2 May 2019 (unitary authority abolished):

Former district councils

Christchurch
Wards from 1 April 1974 (first election 7 June 1973) to 3 May 1979:

Wards from 3 May 1979 to 1 May 2003:

Wards from 1 May 2003 to 2 May 2019 (district abolished):

East Dorset
Wards from 1 April 1974 (first election 7 June 1973) to 5 May 1983:

Wards from 5 May 1983 to 1 May 2003:

Wards from 1 May 2003 to 7 May 2015:

Wards from 7 May 2015 to 2 May 2019 (district abolished):

North Dorset
Wards from 1 April 1974 (first election 7 June 1973) to 5 May 1983:

Wards from 5 May 1983 to 1 May 2003:

Wards from 1 May 2003 to 7 May 2015:

Wards from 7 May 2015 to 2 May 2019 (district abolished):

Purbeck
Wards from 1 April 1974 (first election 7 June 1973) to 3 May 1979:

Wards from 3 May 1979 to 6 May 1999:

Wards from 6 May 1999 to 7 May 2015:

Wards from 7 May 2015 to 2 May 2019 (district abolished):

† minor boundary changes in 2015

West Dorset
Wards from 1 April 1974 (first election 7 June 1973) to 5 May 1983:

Wards from 5 May 1983 to 1 May 2003:

Wards from 1 May 2003 to 7 May 2015:

Wards from 7 May 2015 to 2 May 2019 (district abolished):

Weymouth and Portland
Wards from 1 April 1974 (first election 7 June 1973) to 3 May 1979:

Wards from 3 May 1979 to 10 June 2004:

Wards from 10 June 2004 to 2 May 2019 (district abolished):

Electoral wards by constituency

Bournemouth East
Until 2019

Boscombe East, Boscombe West, East Cliff and Springbourne, East Southbourne and Tuckton, Littledown and Iford, Moordown, Queen's Park, Strouden Park, Throop and Muscliff, West Southbourne.

Since 2019

Boscombe East and Pokesdown, Boscombe West, East Cliff and Springbourne, East Southbourne and Tuckton, Littledown and Iford, Moordown, Queen's Park, Muscliff and Strouden Park, West Southbourne.

Bournemouth West
Alderney, Branksome East, Central, Kinson North, Kinson South, Redhill and Northbourne, Talbot and Branksome Woods, Wallisdown and Winton West, Westbourne and West Cliff, Winton East.

Christchurch
Ameysford, Burton and Winkton, Ferndown Central, Ferndown Links, Grange, Highcliffe, Jumpers, Longham, Mudeford and Friars Cliff, North Highcliffe and Walkford, Parley, Portfield, Purewell and Stanpit, St Catherine's and Hurn, St Leonards and St Ives East, St Leonards and St Ives West, Stapehill, Town Centre, West Highcliffe, West Moors.

Mid Dorset and North Poole
Bere Regis, Broadstone, Canford Heath East, Canford Heath West, Colehill East, Colehill West, Corfe Mullen Central, Corfe Mullen North, Corfe Mullen South, Lytchett Matravers, Lytchett Minster and Upton East, Lytchett Minster and Upton West, Merley and Bearwood, St Martin, Wareham, Wimborne Minster.

North Dorset
Abbey, Alderholt, Blackmore, Blandford Damory Down, Blandford Hilltop, Blandford Langton St Leonards, Blandford Old Town, Blandford Station, Bourton and District, Bulbarrow, Cranborne Chase, Crane, Gillingham Town, Handley Vale, Hill Forts, Holt, Lodbourne, Lydden Vale, Marnhull, Milton, Motcombe and Ham, Portman, Riversdale, Shaftesbury Central, Shaftesbury Christy's, Shaftesbury Grosvenor, Shaftesbury Underhill, Stour, Stour Valley, The Beacon, The Lower Tarrants, The Stours, Three Cross and Potterne, Verwood Dewlands, Verwood Newtown, Verwood Stephen's Castle, Wyke.

Poole
Branksome West, Canford Cliffs, Creekmoor, Hamworthy East, Hamworthy West, Newtown, Oakdale, Parkstone, Penn Hill, Poole Town.

South Dorset
Castle, Creech Barrow, Langton, Littlemoor, Melcombe Regis, Preston, Radipole, Swanage North, Swanage South, Tophill East, Tophill West, Underhill, Upwey and Broadwey, West Purbeck, Westham East, Westham North, Westham West, Wey Valley, Weymouth East, Weymouth West, Winfrith, Wool, Wyke Regis.

West Dorset
Beaminster, Bradford Abbas, Bradpole, Bridport North, Bridport South and Bothenhampton, Broadmayne, Broadwindsor, Burton Bradstock, Cam Vale, Charminster and Cerne Valley, Charmouth, Chesil Bank, Chickerell, Chideock and Symondsbury, Dorchester East, Dorchester North, Dorchester South, Dorchester West, Frome Valley, Halstock, Loders, Lyme Regis, Maiden Newton, Marshwood Vale, Netherbury, Piddle Valley, Puddletown, Queen Thorne, Sherborne East, Sherborne West, Winterborne St Martin, Yetminster.

See also
List of parliamentary constituencies in Dorset

References

Politics of Dorset
Dorset